Paungdale is a small town located within Pyay District, Bago Region of Myanmar. It is about 12 miles from Pyay and 13 miles from Pauk Khaung. Notable people from Paungdale include Ne Win and Tekkatho Phone Naing.

Populated places in Bago Region